Cheliceroides longipalpis is a species of spider in the family Salticidae (jumping spiders), found in China and Vietnam.

The species was initially described from a single male collected from calcareous rocks in rain forest in Vietnam. Females have also been found and described.

Description
The described male is about 9 mm long. The chelicerae are very long with odd outgrowths, the legs quite spiny with a more robust and longer frontal pair. The carapace is brown posteriorly, with a chestnut brown eyefield, which is orange red at the edges and fringed with orange and white, squamose hairs. The opisthosoma features a broad brown median stripe with several yellow spots. On the front end of the stripe there are white hairs, elsewhere it is fringed in grey-brown. The legs are brown, except for parts of the last two pairs, which are orange or yellow.

References

External links
 Salticidae.org: Diagnostic drawings

Salticidae
Spiders of Asia
Spiders described in 1985